Matthew James Taylor (born 30 January 1982) is an English professional football manager and former player who played as a centre back. He is the current manager of EFL Championship side Rotherham United.

Career

Early career as a goalkeeper

1999–2003
Taylor began his career as a goalkeeper playing for Preston North End Boys before being a member of the Everton U17 Academy. He joined Burscough and, alongside brother Joe, played in the club's finest hour – their 2003 FA Trophy final win 2–1 over Tamworth. The game was played at Aston Villa's Villa Park in front of more than 14,000 spectators and was televised live on Sky; the club had started their FA Trophy campaign that year rated at 400–1 to win the silverware. However, it would be his final game for the club as he and a number of other senior players left the club following the departure of the manager Shaun Teale.

2003–2005
After an unsuccessful trial with Lincoln City in July 2003, he joined Rossendale United before moving to Matlock Town, a club his uncle Neil Fairclough had previously played for, at the end of September. He debuted for the club in the 4–0 victory at Ossett Town on 27 September 2003. and his signing coincided with the club going on a run that took them to the top of the Northern Premier League Premier Division table before eventually finishing as runners-up to Hucknall Town; Taylor was named the club's player of the season.

In June 2004, Matlock Town's manager Ernie Moss moved to Hucknall Town and he swiftly returned to his former club to sign Taylor and also his brother Joe who had been with Worksop Town.

On 31 March 2005, he joined Halifax Town until the end of the season but did not make an appearance for the club.

In August 2005 he joined Guiseley on trial, eventually joining the club permanently for the season.

Conversion to a centre back
Taylor combined his playing career with life as a student at Sheffield Hallam University where he played as a centre back, representing the university in the British Universities Sports Association (BUSA) championship games, catching the eye of the Team Bath manager Ged Roddy, who picked him to play as a defender in the England Universities team at the 2006 British Universities Games. He joined Team Bath in the summer of 2006 to play as a centre back whilst studying for a Diploma in Fitness Excellence at the University of Bath. Taylor enjoyed a successful season at the heart of the team's defence being named Players' Player of the Year as the team finished runners-up in the Southern League Premier Division, missing out on promotion to the Conference South after losing 1–0 to Maidenhead United in the play-off final.

Exeter City
In June 2007 he completed a move to Exeter City. He signed a new contract with the club in December, which would expire in 2010. He featured in the Conference play-off final for Exeter, which was won 1–0 and finished the season with 46 appearances and scored nine goals. He played in the club's first game on their return to the Football League, which finished as a 1–1 draw with Darlington.

Charlton Athletic
Taylor signed a two-year contract for Charlton Athletic on 1 July 2011, moving on a free transfer from Exeter City.
In August 2011 he was appointed vice-captain by manager Chris Powell. He quickly established himself in the centre of defence alongside Michael Morrison, and scored his first goal for the club in an FA Cup 4–0 away win at FC Halifax, in November 2011. He was released by Charlton at the end of the 2012–13 season.

Bradford City
On 1 August 2013, Taylor signed for Bradford City on a two-year deal. He was substituted at half-time on his debut, and later suffered a foot injury.

 After three appearances for the Bantams and just one league game under his belt, Taylor joined fellow League One club Colchester United on a one-month loan deal on 20 September, scoring once against Bristol City.

Cheltenham Town
On 25 July 2014, Taylor joined League Two side Cheltenham Town on a two-year deal, and was made club captain. He scored his first goal for the club in a 1–1 draw with AFC Wimbledon.

Newport County
On 6 July 2015, Taylor joined League Two Newport County. He made his debut for Newport on 26 September 2015 as a second-half substitute in the 1–0 win over Carlisle United. He was released by Newport on 1 February 2016.

Bath City
On 8 February 2016, Taylor signed for National League South side Bath City as a player-coach.

Managerial career

Exeter City
Taylor was appointed manager of League Two club Exeter City, who he had previously captained, on 1 June 2018 replacing Paul Tisdale. A bright start led to Taylor being nominated for the August 2018 EFL League Two Manager of the Month award. Taylor voiced his disappointment at missing out on the EFL League Two promotion play-offs, the side missing out on a third successive top 7 finish by a single point.

Taylor won the August 2019 EFL League Two Manager of the Month award following a strong start to Exeter's 2019–20 season, with the side winning four and drawing two of their opening six matches. A strong set of results over the festive period meant Exeter finished 2019 in second place, with Taylor himself being named EFL League Two Manager of the Month for December 2019.

With his side ending the month in fourth position after achieving thirteen points from an unbeaten five matches, Taylor was again awarded the League Two Manager of the Month award for February 2022.

Under Taylor, Exeter City won promotion to League One for the 2022–23 season after finishing second in the 2021–22 League Two table.

On 1 October 2022, following a 2–2 draw with Bristol Rovers, Exeter confirmed that they had given Taylor permission to speak to Rotherham United regarding the vacant managerial position.

Rotherham United
On 3 October 2022, Taylor was confirmed as the new Rotherham United manager, pending talks. The appointment was made official the following day, Taylor signing a contract with the EFL Championship club until 2026 and was joined by his assistant, Wayne Carlisle, on the same contract terms.

Managerial statistics

Honours
Exeter City
EFL League Two runners-up: 2021–22

Individual
EFL League Two Manager of the Month: August 2019, December 2019, February 2022, April 2022

References

External links

1982 births
Living people
Sportspeople from Chorley
English footballers
Association football goalkeepers
Association football defenders
Everton F.C. players
Burscough F.C. players
Rossendale United F.C. players
Matlock Town F.C. players
Hucknall Town F.C. players
Halifax Town A.F.C. players
Guiseley A.F.C. players
Team Bath F.C. players
Exeter City F.C. players
Charlton Athletic F.C. players
Bradford City A.F.C. players
Colchester United F.C. players
Cheltenham Town F.C. players
Newport County A.F.C. players
Bath City F.C. players
National League (English football) players
English Football League players
English football managers
Exeter City F.C. managers
Rotherham United F.C. managers
English Football League managers